The 1999 Dutch Figure Skating Championships took place between 2 and 3 January 1999 in 's-Hertogenbosch. Skaters competed in the disciplines of men's singles and ladies' singles.

Senior results

Men

Ladies

External links
 results

Dutch Figure Skating Championships
Dutch Figure Skating Championships, 1999
1999 in Dutch sport